The Ministry of the Interior is responsible for law enforcement and public safety in Bahrain. The headquarters of the ministry is the Diwan Fort (also known as Manama Fort) in Manama, colloquially referred to as "al-gal'aa".

The current Interior Minister is Lieutenant General Rashid bin Abdullah Al Khalifa, who has been in office since 2004. He is a member of the Al Khalifa royal family and a cousin of King Hamad. Apart from the Bahrain Defence Force, which reports to the Minister of Defence, the public security forces and the Coast Guard report to the Minister of Interior.

Directorates
Public Security Directorate
Capital Governorate Police Directorate
Muharraq Governorate Police Directorate
Northern Governorate Police Directorate
Central Governorate Police Directorate
Southern Governorate Police Directorate
Airport Police Directorate
King Fahad Causeway Police Directorate
Criminal Investigation Directorate
General Directorate of Civil Defence
General Directorate of Guards (Incl. GTS - 'Guards Training School' [Security regulatory authority])
General Directorate of Nationality, Passports, and Residency
Coast Guard Command
Cyber Crime Directorate
Geographic Security Systems Directorate
Royal Academy of Police
General Directorate of Traffic (which serves a similar function to the Spanish counterpart with the same name, run, like the Bahraini General Directorate of Traffic, by that country's Interior Ministry)
Customs Affairs Directorate
Financial Intelligence Directorate
Public Relations Directorate
Police Media Center

Interior Ministers of Bahrain

See also
 National Security Agency (Bahrain)
 Public Security Forces
 Special Security Force Command

References

External links
 
 Public Relations Directorate, Ministry of the Interior
 Police Media Center
 General Directorate of Civil Defence

1971 establishments in Bahrain
Bahrain, Interior
Bahrain, Interior
Interior